The Intelligent Design of Jenny Chow is a play written by Rolin Jones. The play had its world premiere at South Coast Repertory in 2003.

Set in Calabasas, California, it tells the story of Jennifer Marcus, a 22-year-old genius with obsessive compulsive disorder and agoraphobia.  Afraid to step outside her house, the Chinese-born Marcus, who was adopted as a baby, nevertheless wants to meet her biological mother. She creates a robot replica of herself to travel across the world.

The play was a 2006 finalist for the Pulitzer Prize for Drama.

References

External links
 
 The Intelligent Design of Jenny Chow, TheaterMania

American plays
2003 plays
Plays set in California
Asian-American issues